Polygala crassitesta is a species of flowering plant in the family Polygalaceae. It is endemic to Western Australia, the Northern Territory and Queensland.

References

crassitesta